Fourteen buildings and other structures in the English civil parish of Wrenbury cum Frith have been officially designated as listed buildings for their "special architectural and historic interest". Three of the listed buildings are classified as being in grade II* and the remainder in grade II; the parish has no grade-I-listed buildings.

Wrenbury cum Frith is in the Cheshire East division of the ceremonial county of Cheshire, situated on the Cheshire Plain. The River Weaver and the Llangollen Canal both cross the civil parish. Before the railway network reached the area, the canal was important for the transport of locally produced cheese and other dairy products from this dairy farming region to Chester, North Wales and the Midlands. Three timber canal lift bridges of the drawbridge type were constructed by Thomas Telford, probably in the 1790s, after his appointment as engineer to what was then known as the Ellesmere Canal. Two of the lift bridges are footbridges serving farms, which are still operated manually using the original counterweight system; they are listed at grade II*. The third, believed to be one of only two lift bridges of this type in the country to carry road traffic, has had a mechanical crank fitted. A fourth sandstone road bridge crosses the Weaver. A lock on the canal is also listed.

The village of Wrenbury is the only substantial settlement in the civil parish. Many of the listed buildings and structures in the civil parish are located within the conservation area that protects much of its centre and spreads north-west to beyond the canal. Five cluster around the village green and the adjacent parish church dedicated to St Margaret, the third grade-II*-listed structure. The church dates from the early 16th century and is the oldest listed structure in the civil parish. The four half-timbered "black and white" cottages to have listed status all date from the 17th century; this century accounts for half of the timber-framed buildings in Cheshire. The earliest are believed to be Elm House on the village green and a small cottage within the churchyard, thought to be a former almshouse and a schoolmaster's house associated with the free school founded in 1605, also located in the churchyard. Later listed buildings are built in brick, a reflection of the shift in domestic architecture from timber framing to brick construction, also observed in unlisted buildings. The most recent listed building is the village primary school of 1879, which is typical of the local schools built after the Education Act of 1870.

Listed buildings and structures

See also 

 Listed buildings in Norbury
 Listed buildings in Cholmondeley
 Listed buildings in Chorley
 Listed buildings in Baddiley
 Listed buildings in Sound
 Listed buildings in Newhall
 Listed buildings in Dodcott cum Wilkesley
 Listed buildings in Marbury cum Quoisley

Notes and references

Sources 
 Latham, Frank A. (ed.) Wrenbury and Marbury (The Local History Group; 1999)
 McKenna, Laurie. Timber Framed Buildings in Cheshire (Cheshire County Council; 1994)
 Smiles, Samuel. The Life of Thomas Telford, Civil Engineer (John Murray; 1867)

Listed buildings in the Borough of Cheshire East
Lists of listed buildings in Cheshire